Hasanabad (also Romanized as Ḩasanābād; also known as Ḩasanābād-e Sarjām) is a village in Sarjam Rural District, Ahmadabad District, Mashhad County, Razavi Khorasan Province, Iran. At the 2006 census, its population was 867, in 235 families.

References 

Populated places in Mashhad County